Moustafá Moustafá (born 1955) is a Greek politician of Turkish descent. In January 2015, Moustafá was elected to Greek Parliament on the Syriza ticket. He received the largest number of votes in his constituency, Rodopi. Previously, he was a Synaspismos MP between 1996 and 2000 and unsuccessfully ran for re-election with Syriza in 2009.

Moustafá  is a graduate of the Medical School of the University of Istanbul and making medicine  in Komotini. He is married to psychologist Elvan Moustafá and has two daughters.

References

External links
 

1955 births
Greek people of Turkish descent
Living people
Istanbul University alumni
Coalition of Left, of Movements and Ecology politicians
Greek MPs 1996–2000
Syriza politicians
Greek MPs 2015 (February–August)
Greek MPs 2015–2019
People from Rhodope (regional unit)
Greek former Muslims
Greek atheists